Merret's snailfish (Careproctus merretti), also called the snakehead snailfish, is a species of fish in the family Liparidae.

Etymology
It is named for the British ichthyologist Nigel Merrett (born 1940).

Description

Merret's snailfish is silvery-pink in colour, with a black peritoneum. It has 69 vertebrae. Its hypural plate (expanded ends of the hypurals that form a wide, fan-like plate onto which the caudal fin rays are attached) is single, and there are no epurals.

Habitat

References

Liparidae
Fish described in 1988
Taxa named by Anatoly Andriyashev
Taxa named by Natalia Vladimirovna Chernova